Elsie Fest is an annual music festival in New York City co-created and produced by Darren Criss, Ricky Rollins, Lea Michele, and Jordan Roth. The yearly festival is touted as "New York City’s first outdoor music festival celebrating tunes from the stage and screen". Elsie Fest's inaugural event was held at New York City's JBL Live at Pier 97 on September 27, 2015. A portion of the proceeds benefited BroadwayCares/Equity Fights AIDS.

Lineups 
The 2015 line-up included:

The second annual Elsie Fest was held on September 5, 2016, at the Ford Amphitheatre on Coney Island, NY. The line-up included:

Elsie Fest returned for its third production on October 8, 2017, at Central Park's Summerstage and amassed a crowd of more than 4,000 fans. The line-up included:

In 2018, Elsie Fest returned to Central Park's Summerstage on October 7, and featured performances from:

In 2019, Elsie Fest announced its annual festival would be held on October 5th, 2019 again at Central Park's Summerstage. The line-up included:

In 2020, Elsie Fest was cancelled due to the ongoing COVID-19 pandemic.

In 2021, it was held during the BRIC Celebrate Brooklyn! Festival at the Prospect Park Bandshell. The line-up included:

References 

Music festivals in New York City